Nitrous oxide, is an inhaled gas used as a pain medication and together with other medications for anesthesia. Common uses include during childbirth, following trauma, and as part of end-of-life care. Onset of effect is typically within half a minute, and the effect lasts for about a minute.

There are few side effects, other than vomiting, with short-term use. With long-term use anemia or numbness may occur. It should always be given with at least 21% oxygen. It is not recommended in people with a bowel obstruction or pneumothorax. Use in the early part of pregnancy is not recommended. It is possible to continue breastfeeding following use.

Nitrous oxide was discovered between 1772 and 1793 and used for anesthesia in 1844. It is on the World Health Organization's List of Essential Medicines. It often comes as a 50/50 mixture with oxygen. Devices with a demand valve are available for self-administration. The setup and maintenance is relatively expensive for developing countries.

Medical uses
Nitrous oxide (N2O) is itself active (does not require any changes in the body to become active), and so has an onset in roughly the lung–brain circulation time. This gives it a peak action 30 seconds after the start of administration; Entonox should thus be used accordingly, i.e. inhalation should start 30 seconds before a contraction becomes painful in labour. It is removed from the body unchanged via the lungs, and does not accumulate under normal conditions, explaining the rapid offset of around 60 seconds. It is effective in managing pain during labor and delivery.

Nitrous oxide is more soluble than oxygen and nitrogen, so will tend to diffuse into any air spaces within the body. This makes it dangerous to use in patients with pneumothorax or those who have recently been scuba diving, and there are cautions over its use with any bowel obstruction.

Its analgesic effect is strong (equivalent to 15 mg of subcutaneous route morphine) and characterised by rapid onset and offset, i.e. it is very fast-acting and wears off very quickly.

When used in combination with other anesthetics gases, nitrous oxide causes a dose dependent increased respiratory rate and decreased tidal volumes, the net effect is a lower minute ventilation. Like volatile anesthetics, it increases cerebral blood flow and intracranial pressure. However, contrary to volatile anesthetics, it leads to an increase in cerebral metabolic rate of oxygen.

Contraindications
N2O should not be used in patients with bowel obstruction, pneumothorax, or middle ear or sinus disease, and should also not be used on any patient who has been scuba diving within the preceding 24 hours or in violently disturbed psychiatric patients.
There are also clinical cautions in place for the first two trimesters of pregnancy and in patients with decreased levels of consciousness.

Composition

The gas is a mixture of half nitrous oxide (N2O) and half oxygen (O2).  The ability to combine N2O and oxygen at high pressure while remaining in the gaseous form is caused by the Poynting effect (after John Henry Poynting, an English physicist).

The Poynting effect involves the dissolution of gaseous O2 when bubbled through liquid N2O, with vaporisation of the liquid to form a gaseous O2/N2O mixture.

Inhalation of pure N2O over a continued period would deprive the patient of oxygen, but the 50% oxygen content prevents this from occurring. The two gases will separate at low temperatures (<4 °C), which would permit administration of hypoxic mixtures. Therefore, it is not given from a cold cylinder without being shaken (usually by cylinder inversion) to remix the gases.

Administration
The gas is self-administered through a demand valve, using a mouthpiece, bite block or face mask.  Self-administration of Entonox is safe because if enough is inhaled to start to induce anaesthesia, the patient becomes unable to hold the valve, and so will drop it and soon exhale the residual gas. This means that unlike other anaesthetic gases, it does not require the presence of an anaesthetist for administration. The 50% oxygen in Entonox ensures the person will have sufficient oxygen in their alveoli and conducting airways for a short period of apnea to be safe.

History

Pure N2O was first used as a medical analgesic in December 1844, when Horace Wells made the first 12–15 dental operations with the gas in Hartford.

Its debut as a generally accepted method, however, came in 1863, when Gardner Quincy Colton introduced it more broadly at all the Colton Dental Association clinics, that he founded in New Haven and New York City.

The first devices used in dentistry to administer the gas consisted of a simple breathing bag made of rubber cloth.

Breathing the pure gas often caused hypoxia (oxygen insufficiency) and sometimes death by asphyxiation.  Eventually practitioners became aware of the need to provide at least 21% oxygen content in the gas (the same percentage as in air).  In 1911, the anaesthetist Arthur Ernest Guedel first described the use of self-administration of a nitrous oxide and oxygen mix.  It was not until 1961 that the first paper was published by Michael Tunstall and others, describing the administration of a pre-mixed 50:50 nitrous oxide and oxygen mix, which led to the commercialisation of the product.

In 1970, Peter Baskett recognised that pre-mixed nitrous oxide and oxygen mix could have an important part to play in the provision of pre-hospital pain relief management, provided by ambulance personnel. Baskett contacted the Chief Ambulance Officer for the Gloucestershire Ambulance Brigade, Alan Withnell, to suggest this idea. This gained traction when Baskett negotiated with the British Oxygen Company, the availability of pre-mixed nitrous oxide and oxygen mix apparatus for training. Regular training sessions began at Frenchay Hospital (Bristol) and a pilot study was run in Gloucestershire (in which ambulances were crewed by a driver and one of the new highly trained ambulance men), the results of this trial were published in 1970.

Today the nitrous oxide is administered in hospitals by a relative analgesia machine, which includes several improvements such as flowmeters and constant-flow regulators, an anaesthetic vaporiser, a medical ventilator, and a scavenger system, and delivers a precisely dosed and breath-actuated flow of nitrous oxide mixed with oxygen.

The machine used in dentistry is much simpler, and is meant to be used by the patient in a fully conscious state. The gas is delivered through a demand-valve inhaler over the nose, which will only release gas when the patient inhales through it.

Society and culture
Nitronox was a registered trademark of the BOC Group between 1966 and 1999, and was reregistered by Hs Tm Inc since 2005 It is also colloquially known as "gas and air" in the United Kingdom.

Research
Investigational trials show potential for antidepressant applications of N2O, especially for treatment-resistant forms of depression, and it is rapid-acting.

References

Further reading

External links
 BabyCentre entry on Entonox
 Detailed medical analysis of the drug

Breathing gases
Emergency medical equipment
First aid
General anesthetics
Oxygen
Pain management
World Health Organization essential medicines
Wikipedia medicine articles ready to translate